Melville High School is a state co-educational secondary school located in Hamilton, Waikato, New Zealand.

References

Secondary schools in Hamilton, New Zealand